Tanya Selene Saracho is a Mexican-American actress, playwright, dramaturge and screenwriter. With a background in theater before writing for television, she co-founded  in 2000 and was its co-artistic director for ten years. She also co-founded the Alliance of Latinx Theater Artists (ALTA) of Chicago. She is particularly known for centering the "Latina gaze". She developed and was showrunner of the Starz series , which ran for three seasons (2018-2020). Saracho signed a three-year development deal with Starz in February 2018.

Early life 
Both cities are part of the bi-national Reynosa–McAllen metropolitan area straddling the Rio Grande. She and her family-members went back and forth between Mexico and the United States often — with her father commuting over the border in 2008. She attended middle and high school in McAllen and enrolled in Boston University College of Fine Arts to study theater, earning a Bachelor of Fine Arts degree.

Career

Theater 
Reluctant to move to New York or Los Angeles, her career started when she moved to Chicago in 1998 with her college roommate. They chose Chicago partly because the Steppenwolf Theatre Company had shown the city to be somewhere where artists could start a theater group and see it grow to success. Saracho first tried working mostly as an actress, but found her opportunities as a Latina were limited, with the only roles available for Latina actors being maids and sex workers. As a result, after having met Coya Paz (who was initially reluctant) at an audition, the two founded  in June 2000. This self-proclaimed all-Latina theater group had an original ensemble of 10 women from diverse backgrounds; its establishment was partly funded through the sale of a house Saracho's father had bought her in Mexico.

The same year, Saracho co-founded The Alliance of Latinx Theater Artists (ALTA) of Chicago, which describes itself as "a service organization dedicated to furthering the Chicago Latinx Theater movement by promoting, educating, representing, and unifying Latinx-identified artists and their allies".

The transition into more independent work was easy for Saracho as she had already been involved in some independent theater, such as her adaptation of The House on Mango Street at the Steppenwolf Theatre. Both plays received nominations for the Joseph Jefferson Award Citation for New Work of a Play, all in 2009. The work played at Chicago's Viaduct Studio Theater and, on weekend performances, Saracho played all 3 roles herself.

Despite moving from storefront theaters to larger scaled stages such as the Goodman and Steppenwolf, Saracho still kept true to her storefront start: "And the cover of Time Out Chicago — the scrappy, storefront aesthetic got me on that cover. The fact that we respect and honor the storefront — I feel like that is why I am here right now. I need to always be of both worlds." She was also then working on two Andrew W. Mellon Foundation commissions for Steppenwolf Theatre, an adaptation of a  play for Oregon Shakespeare Festival called The Tenth Muse, and a historical fiction piece for About Face Theatre called The Good Private. The latter, about a transgender soldier in the American Civil War, was inspired by the story of Albert Cashier, recognized as female on birth in Ireland but who lived out their life in Illinois as a man after fighting for the Union Army. In late 2012, her play Song for the Disappeared about an estranged borderland family brought together by the disappearance of their younger brother, was performed at the Goodman Theatre.

Throughout her work, she has sought to provide representation for Latinx people, to redress stereotypes: "You know how Jill Soloway is talking about the female gaze? I'm interested in the Latina gaze for the foreseeable future."

Overall her theater career has led her plays to be performed at many different venues, including the Goodman Theatre, Steppenwolf Theatre Company, Fountain Theater, Clubbed Thumb, Next Theater Company, The Oregon Shakespeare Festival and 16th Street Theater. She has also had commissions at some of these theaters, and others, including the Goodman Theatre, Steppenwolf Theatre, Two Rivers Theater, Denver Theater Center, and South Coast Rep.

Her 2014 work also included Mala Hierba at the Second Stage Uptown and Hushabye as part of Steppenwolf's First Look in 2014. Saracho's additional involvements include being a member of The Kilroys' List and founding the Ñ Project. Saracho is also a member of SAG-AFTRA and the Writers Guild of America West and has worked as a voice-over actress.

Television: In the writers' room 
In 2012, Saracho began working in television, benefiting from the ABC Diversity program. In her first TV job, as a staff writer at Lifetime's Devious Maids in 2013, her office-mate told her she was "the diversity writer" and her agent confirmed that she was not costing the showrunner any budget. She has described feeling unprepared at the time, experiencing impostor syndrome and she was new to Final Draft. She was relieved when Gloria Calderón Kellett joined the show, and has talked about the culture shock of seeing very few other Latinx faces there and becoming close to the Spanish-speaking janitorial staff as a result. With the mixed cultural experience of her work at Lifetime on her mind, she instead wrote a two-hander for the Goodman Theatre, where one character was a first-year TV writer and the other a janitor. The Denver Theatre Center commissioned Saracho to expand that work to create Fade, which premièred there in Winter 2016.

After Devious Maids, Saracho wrote for HBO's Girls and Looking (in 2013–14), along with ABC's How to Get Away with Murder. For Looking, she wrote the episode where Patrick (Jonathan Groff) introduced his Latino boyfriend Richie (played by Saracho's longtime friend Raúl Castillo) to his friends. She also pitched her play Mala Hierba to HBO as a television show; her agent sending the script of Mala Hierba as a sample of her work is part of how Saracho came to be interviewed for the Looking writers' room. Initially she was reluctant to write gay male characters, as she felt she "wouldn't know what to say". She was convinced after speaking with showrunner Michael Lannan, especially when she discovered that Lannan had heard of one of Saracho's personal heroes, .

Saracho continued writing for theater while also writing for television. In the early 2010s, she sublet in Los Angeles rather than moving full-time from Chicago while working for both TV and theater, saying that she felt a need "to know I belong in Chicago". By 2016, however, she was talking about Los Angeles as being her reluctant residence. At the time, as well as working on the scripts for the TV show that would become Vida, she was also working on 2 theater commissions: a play set in Red Bank, New Jersey, about the number of Latinx people moving to the area, and a second for Costa Mesa, California's South Coast Repertory about domestic workers in Orange County, California.

Between seasons of Looking, she was working on The Tenth Muse, an all-female play set in a convent in Colonial Mexico and she spoke about the change in writing style as being "jarring" and "like whiplash", where stage directions and scene lengths have to be quite different between the two media. She observed in the same interview that it was "such a strange time" to be working in television, as social media had made television an interactive experience, with aspiring writers asking her questions on Twitter and fans of Looking feeling like they know the actors, rather than just the characters.

Television: As showrunner 
More recently, with production company Big Beach, she has created, co-written, co-produced and is showrunner for LGBTQ+ Latinx show Vida. For Vida, she has assembled an all-Latinx, "heavily queer" writers' room — all female-identified except for one cis-male — and a directorial team who are all Latinx or women of color. Saracho rejects the idea that it is difficult to find talent of colour, also citing Beyoncé demonstrating that same point at Coachella. Saracho has described  explicitly as being a show coming from a "female brown queer perspective". She also made clear that  is not a show about immigrants: "It's a show about Americans. Who are the grandchildren of immigrants ... this is a show about American girls." The show does, however, include characters who are undocumented immigrants and DACA recipients — as does the cast. Similarly, the dialog is deliberately in Spanglish, like much of Saracho's theater work, and code switches in a way that is natural to Saracho. As her background is Texan rather than Californian, thought, she relied on members of her writers' room from Eastside Los Angeles to help ensure the terms were true to the characters and not skewed by Spanglish more natural to Americans of Cuban and Puerto Rican backgrounds. Talking to Breaking Character magazine in 2017, she described  — then still known by its working title Pour Vida, named for the Richard Villegas Jr. short story that inspired the show — as "thematically it's the same stuff from 2000 when I was starting to write; Latinas at the center, women of color, just a feminist Latina take. Like the Gloria Anzaldúa take, intersectional, you know?" Immediately before the show premièred, Saracho described it to them. as being "about finding your authentic self. It’s about finding a way back home." To avoid gentrifying Boyle Heights by virtue of filming there, shooting mainly took place in Pico-Union.

The queerness came from me. I identify as queer, and it had to be there." The show seeks to normalise both trans and Latinx representation, including trans actors without their gender identity being central to the story. In an interview with Deadline Hollywood, Saracho described the importance of Latinx representation: "Out of 520 shows right now, now five are of a Latinx gaze, you know. That’s not enough. We make up almost 20% of this country, so that’s erasure. So for so long we’ve been erased." Saracho felt it important to show queer Latinx character in their own context:

The explicit sex-scenes, both heterosexual and lesbian scenes, were also deliberate inclusions, being considered integral to telling the audience more about the characters involved and written and directed for the female gaze. Saracho has also spoken about how few shows come from a Latina gaze: "It's Jane the Virgin and One Day at a Time on one end of the spectrum, and La Reina del Sur and Narcos on the other. ... We get the good wholesomeness, or we get the cartel."

In February 2018, Saracho signed a 3-year deal with Starz, expanding on their relationship: "I was a playwright who was still learning the ropes when Starz took a chance on me to create and showrun . They nurtured and supported me during every step of the strenuous process and that is a debt that cannot be repaid." Season 2 is due to air on Starz in Spring 2019, and will include her long-time friend Raúl Castillo in a recurring role. Saracho has also talked about both the possibility of providing representation of "brown women and queers" but also the responsibility she feels not to misrepresent those stories. She also wants to ensure she can provide mentorship to a younger generation of artists from underrepresented communities, to which end she was involved in December 2018's Diverse Women in Media Forum, hosted by the National Association of Latino Independent Producers, where she talked about the radical nature of representation: "It’s a political act to put brown bodies on the screen, already. And to put brown bodies on the screen just living, it’s the most radical act."

In June 2019, Saracho will speak on 2 panels at the ATX Television Festival, "Let's Talk About Sex (Scenes)" and, with her  writers, "Inside the Writers' Room", where they will discuss their storytelling approach.

She is also developing another series with Big Beach called , based on her 2007 play , which will follow four Afro-Caribbean / Latinx Chicagoans within the  counter-culture and its intersection with feminism, described in publicity material as "a means for Latinx feminists to reconnect with their heritage through music, style, nightlife, and art. It’s a powerful return to indigenous practices and a reclamation of feminine strength."

Awards and recognition 
Saracho was named Best New Playwright by Chicago magazine, one of the nine national  by Café magazine and given the first  award in theater by the National Museum of Mexican Art. She has also won the Goodman's Ofner Prize, a 3Arts Artists Award and a National Endowment for the Arts Distinguished New Play Development Project Grant with About Face Theater.

In June 2020, in honor of the 50th anniversary of the first LGBTQ Pride parade, Queerty named her among the fifty heroes “leading the nation toward equality, acceptance, and dignity for all people”.

Personal life 
Saracho identifies as queer and has a mainly LGBTQ+ social circle. She was diagnosed with diabetes in 2010, of which there is a family history. She has also spoken about suffering from anxiety and impostor syndrome.

By 2008, as a green card-holder, she was the only member of her family who had not naturalized to American citizenship, being unready to renounce her Mexican citizenship. But when Barack Obama won the 2008 presidential election, she realised she wanted to become a U.S. citizen in order to be able to vote for his re-election.

I chose her and she chose me. My heart is there." Despite having spent several years in Los Angeles, she still feels that Chicago is her home: "When I go back I’m like, ‘This is where I belong!’ ". She has also spoken about having experienced racism in Chicago, however, and more widely.

She grew up, went to school and to college with fellow Mexican-American actor Raúl Castillo, who was her first high-school boyfriend at the age of 14, coincidentally writing a key episode for his character in Looking. She mentioned in a 2014 interview that: "He's like a sibling. I've known him 22 years and almost every male character that I write is a version of Raúl." When they were in high-school, they ordered Latinx scripts together from Samuel French, Inc. and treasured scripts from authors such as José Rivera, Milcha Sanchez-Scott and Octavio Solis.

She has described herself as a fangirl of the Starz show Outlander, partly because it caters so well to the female gaze. Recognising her love for the series, Starz sent her a hamper of show-related items when  was greenlit.

In 2014, she was disowned by her father, who forbade her from attending her grandmother's funeral. As a result, rather than spending Christmas with family, she decided to take a 2-week trip to Scotland, inspired by her love of Outlander. She broke up with her girlfriend before leaving, and on the trip, met and began dating a man named Colin Stubbs.

Saracho considers the 17th-century nun  as an inspiration: "Some say she was the first writer of the Americas, a long time before there was a North America. And she was a feminist. I think she was queer—she wrote these amazing love poems to women and she was in convent, so you do the math. And she was just a badass." She also found the influence of African-American playwrights and professors Lynn Nottage and Lydia R. Diamond useful when she was "forging [her] identity as a Chicago artist". She described studying with Cuban-American avant-garde playwright , another LGBT Latina, as a formative influence.

List of works

Theatre 

 Generic Latina (2001)
   ("Let Me Tell You", 2001)
  (2002)
 The María Chronicles (2003)
  ("Electricity", 2004, performing as Vecina)
  (2005 and reworked in 2006)
  ("Removing Myths", 2006, 3 female characters)
  (2007, 4 female monologues, 1 by Saracho)
  (2007)
  (2007)
  (2008, 5 female)
 Our Lady of the Underpass (2009, 2 male, 4 female)
 The House on Mango Street (2009)
  (2011, 1 male, 4 female)
 Song for the Disappeared (2012)
 The Tenth Muse (2013, 7 female)
 The Good Private (2013)
  ("Weed", 2014, 4 female)
 Hushabye (2014, 3 male, 2 female)
 Fade (2016, 1 male, 1 female)

Television

Notes

External links 

 
 
 
 

Living people
Year of birth missing (living people)
American actresses of Mexican descent
American dramatists and playwrights
American television writers
American writers of Mexican descent
21st-century Mexican actresses
21st-century Mexican women writers
People with diabetes
Mexican feminist writers
Mexican stage actresses
Mexican television writers
Mexican women dramatists and playwrights
Mexican women screenwriters
Chicana feminists
Hispanic and Latino American dramatists and playwrights
Screenwriters from Texas
Showrunners
American women television writers
Writers from Chicago
Writers from Sinaloa
Queer women
Queer actresses
Queer dramatists and playwrights
Queer screenwriters
Mexican LGBT actors
American LGBT actors
Mexican LGBT dramatists and playwrights
American LGBT dramatists and playwrights
Mexican LGBT screenwriters
American LGBT screenwriters
LGBT television producers
American women television producers
LGBT Hispanic and Latino American people
21st-century American screenwriters
21st-century American women writers